Schoutedeniastes is a genus of "jewel beetles" in the subfamily Polycestinae, containing the following species:

 Schoutedeniastes amabilis (Laporte & Gory, 1835)
 Schoutedeniastes apicata (Waterhouse, 1882)
 Schoutedeniastes birmanica (Thery, 1947)
 Schoutedeniastes duaulti Baudon, 1962
 Schoutedeniastes hatai (Ohmomo & Akiyama, 1994)
 Schoutedeniastes heiroglyphica (Thery, 1904)
 Schoutedeniastes igorrota (Heller, 1891)
 Schoutedeniastes magnifica (Waterhouse, 1875)
 Schoutedeniastes ohkurai (Akiyama & Ohmomo, 1992)
 Schoutedeniastes vitalisi (Bourgoin, 1922)

References

Buprestidae genera